Werneuchen station is a railway station in the municipality of Werneuchen, located in the Barnim district in Brandenburg, Germany. It is served by the Regionalbahn service RB 25 of the Niederbarnimer Eisenbahn to Berlin and is its terminal station.

References

Railway stations in Brandenburg
Buildings and structures in Barnim
Railway stations in Germany opened in 1898